Leucospermum pluridens is a large upright evergreen shrub of up to  high assigned to the family Proteaceae. It has leathery, oblong to wedge-shaped leaves of about 7½ cm long and 2½ cm wide, deeply incised near the tip with seven to ten teeth. It has initially yellow, later carmine coloured flower heads. The 2 cm long bracts have slender, recurved tips. From the center of the perianth emerge long styles that jointly give the impression of a pincushion. It is called Robinson pincushion in English and Robinson-kreupelhout in Afrikaans. Flowers can be found between September and December. It naturally occurs in the south of South Africa.

Description 

The trunk and lower branches are covered by a smooth grey bark. Characteristically, young plants branch only sparsely from the stiff upright stem, but older plants develop more branches. The tip of the leaf is rounded, often deeply incised and bears seven to ten very prominent rounded teeth.

The bract subtending the individual flower is cartilaginous in consistency, keeled and wraps around the base of the flower, about 1 cm long and 6 mm wide, with long pointed tip that curves slightly inwards and with a row of long hairs along the edges. The perianth is 4-merous. The middle part (or claws) is initially yellow, becoming bright carmine, roughly hairy on the inner surface, with long straight hairs between short felty hairs. The claw facing the middle of is hairless near the base. The upper part (or limbs), which enclosed the pollen presenter in the bud, are broadly lance-shaped with a pointy tip, each about 5 mm long and 2 mm wide, felty, those facing the centre of the head and the sides with in addition long silky hairs. The limb facing the edge of the head is less densely felty than the other three.

Differences with other species 
Leucospermum pluridens differs from its close relative Leucospermum glabrum because it has felty to spiderweb-like, grey indumentum on the flowering branches, the pointy, narrowly cone-shaped acute common base of the flower head, exceptionally long (up to 2 cm) bracts subtending the flower with a long pointed and recurved tip and edges with a row of long hears and leaves with six to nine deep incisions.

Taxonomy 
As far as we know, Margaret Levyns was the first to collect of the Robinson pincushion in 1938 on the Rooiberg Pass, south of Calitzdorp. Since it also can be found on the north facing slopes of the Outeniqua Mountains near the Attaquas Kloof, which was traveled by Francis Masson, Carl Peter Thunberg and other collectors, it is curious that this striking shrub seems to have been overlooked for a very long time. John Patrick Rourke realised it was a new species, which he described in 1970 and called Leucospermum pluridens.

Leucospermum pluridens is assigned to the tree pincushions, section Conocarpodendron.

The species name pluridens is a compounding of the Latin words pluris meaning "many" and dens meaning "teeth".

Distribution, habitat and ecology  
On both locations, the species occur, in the so-called Arid Fynbos, a transitional vegetation type on the interface between fynbos and Karoo. This is most evidently demonstrated at Kruis Pad where this species can be found associated with Aloe ferox and several Cotyledon, Elytropappus, and Restionaceae on dry, hot, north facing hills. Within the distribution of the Robinson pincushion the average annual precipitation is 250–400 mm. This makes the requirements (10–15 in annual precipitation) of L. pluridens quite different from those of its close relative, L. glabrum. The species also grows in the Baviaanskloof.

The fruits are ripe about two months after flowering, when they fall to the ground. Here they are gathered by ants that carry them to their underground nest, where they remain until they germinate after a fire has removed the overhead vegetation cover.

Conservation 
The Robinson pincushion is considered near threatened. For unknown reasons, its population size has declined in the past, but seems to have stabilised now.

References

External links 
 several photos

Endemic flora of South Africa
pluridens
Plants described in 1970